Bestyakh (Besteex) is a rural locality (a selo), the only inhabited locality, and the administrative center of Bestyakhsky Rural Okrug of Zhigansky District in the Sakha Republic, Russia, located  from Zhigansk, the administrative center of the district. Its population as of the 2010 Census was 218, of whom 111 were male and 107 female, down from 228 recorded during the 2002 Census.

References

Notes

Sources
Official website of the Sakha Republic. Registry of the Administrative-Territorial Divisions of the Sakha Republic. Zhigansky District. 

Rural localities in Zhigansky District
Populated places on the Lena River